Time Is Running Out is a 1970 West German short documentary film directed by . It was nominated for an Academy Award for Best Documentary Short.

References

External links

1970 films
1970 documentary films
1970 short films
German short documentary films
1970s short documentary films
West German films
1970s English-language films
1970s German films